Ograzhden may refer to:

 Ograzhden (mountain)
 Ograzhden, Dobrich Province, village in Bulgaria
 Ograzhden Cove, cove on Livingston Island in the South Shetland Islands